Pelin Akil (born 17 April 1986) is a Turkish actress. Her paternal family is of Bosnian descent. Her maternal family is of Turkish descent who immigrated from Macedonia. She is a graduate of musical theatre from Istanbul University. She is married to Anıl Altan with twins, Doğa Alin Altan and Duru Lina Altan.

She played in many popular films and musicals. She played with her husband Anıl Altan for many times. 

Her television career started in hit youth series "Arka Sıradakiler". Her period series are dramas "Kurt Kanunu", "Barbaroslar: Akdeniz'in Kılıcı" and comedies "Seksenler". Her surreal series and film are "Osmanlı Tokadı" and "Keşif". She joined hit series Suskunlar which the first Turkish drama sold to the USA market for remake.She played in agent series "Kızıl Elma" with Furkan Palalı. With Oktay Kaynarca, she played together in series "Ben Bu Cihana Sığmazam", "Eşkıya Dünyaya Hükümdar Olmaz", "İnadına Yaşamak".

Musical theater 
 Marika'nın Serveti
 Rent Müzikali
 Abim Geldi
 Istanbulname
 Sersefil-Korkuyorum sevgilim
 Depo

Filmography

Cinema
2018 Keşif
2017 Bittin Sen (TV movie)
2017 Damat Takımı
2017 Deli Aşk
2015 Saklı
2014 Su ve Ateş
2013 Ana (Short movie)

Film series

TV series

Presenter
Uzak Ara Eğlence

Commercial 
 Uno Ekmek
 Kaşmir Halı
 Ülker Caramio

Music video

References

1986 births
Living people
Turkish film actresses
Turkish television actresses
Turkish people of Bosniak descent
Turkish people of Macedonian descent
Actresses from Istanbul